The Grande Dent de Veisivi is a mountain of the Swiss Pennine Alps, overlooking Les Haudères in the canton of Valais. Nearby is the Petite Dent de Veisivi.

References

External links
 Grande Dent de Veisivi on Hikr

Mountains of the Alps
Alpine three-thousanders
Mountains of Switzerland
Mountains of Valais